tert-Amyl methyl ether (TAME)  is an ether used as a fuel oxygenate. TAME derives from C5 distillation fractions of naphtha. It has an ethereous odor. Unlike most ethers, it does not require a stabilizer as it does not form peroxides on storage.

Uses
TAME is mostly used as an oxygenate to gasoline. It is added for three reasons: to increase octane enhancement, to replace banned tetraethyl lead, and to raise the oxygen content in gasoline. It is known that TAME in fuel reduces exhaust emissions of some volatile organic compounds.

TAME is also used as a solvent in organic synthesis as a more environmentally friendly  alternative to some of the classic ether solvents. It is characterized by a high boiling point (86 °C) and a low freezing point (−80 °C), allowing a wide range of reaction temperatures. TAME can be used as a safe reaction medium (e.g. condensation reactions, coupling reactions, such as Grignard reactions and Suzuki reactions, as well as metal hydride reductions) and as an extraction solvent to replace dichloromethane, aromatics, and other ethers.

Toxicity

In an animal toxicology study, inhalation of high concentrations of TAME (4000 ppm) caused central nervous system depression, leading to death in most cases.

See also
Methyl tert-butyl ether
Ethyl tert-butyl ether
List of gasoline additives

References 

Dialkyl ethers
Oxygenates